Nachmann is a German-language surname. Notable people with the surname include:

Fritz Nachmann (born 1929), West German  luger
Kurt Nachmann (1915–1984), Austrian screenwriter and film actor
Werner Nachmann (1925 – 1988), German entrepreneur and politician

See also

Nachman

German-language surnames